Weeki Wachee Preserve (also given as Weekiwachee Preserve) is an 11,206 acre preserve in Hernando County, Florida. The preserve is located at 2345 Osowaw Boulevard in Spring Hill, Florida. The preserve offers recreational opportunities such as hiking and bike trails, fishing, and boating for hand-launched non-gasoline engine crafts.

The site is known for its population of black bears. It is Site 69 on the west section of the Great Florida Birding Trail.

See also
Aripeka Sandhills Preserve

References

Protected areas of Hernando County, Florida
Southwest Florida Water Management District reserves